Italy sent a delegation to compete at the 2010 Winter Paralympics in Vancouver, British Columbia, Canada. A total of 35 Italian competitors were expected to take part in four sports:

Participants
Alpine skiing: 9 athletes (+1 guide athlete);
Cross-country skiing: 6 athletes;
Ice sledge hockey: 15 athletes;
Wheelchair curling: 5 athletes.

Medalist

Alpine skiing 

Women

Men

Cross-country skiing

Ice sledge hockey

Wheelchair curling

See also
Italy at the 2010 Winter Olympics

References

External links
Vancouver 2010 Paralympic Games official website
International Paralympic Committee official website

Nations at the 2010 Winter Paralympics
2010
Paralympics